Francisco Vidal may refer to:

Juan Francisco de Vidal (1800–1863), 19th century President of Peru
Francisco Vidal Gormaz (1837–1907), Chilean navy officer and hydrographer
Francisco Vidal Salinas, Chilean politician
Francisco Antonino Vidal (1827–1889), president of Uruguay